The Expedition of the Thousand was an event of the Italian Risorgimento that took place in 1860. A corps of volunteers led by Giuseppe Garibaldi sailed from Quarto, near Genoa (now Quarto dei Mille) and landed in Marsala, Sicily, in order to conquer the Kingdom of the Two Sicilies, ruled by the House of Bourbon-Two Sicilies.

The project was an ambitious and risky venture aiming to conquer, with a thousand men, a kingdom with a larger regular army and a more powerful navy. The expedition was a success and concluded with a plebiscite that brought Naples and Sicily into the Kingdom of Sardinia, the last territorial conquest before the proclamation of the Kingdom of Italy on 17 March 1861.

The sea venture was the only desired action that was jointly decided by the "four fathers of the nation" Giuseppe Mazzini, Giuseppe Garibaldi, Victor Emmanuel II, and Camillo Cavour, pursuing divergent goals. However, the Expedition was instigated by Francesco Crispi, who utilized his political influence to bolster the Italian unification project.

The various groups participated in the expedition for a variety of reasons: for Garibaldi, it was to achieve a united Italy; to the Sicilian bourgeoisie, an independent Sicily as part of the kingdom of Italy, and for common people, land distribution and the end of oppression.

The expedition and the whole enterprise was heavily supported by the British, who wanted to establish a friendly government in Southern Italy, which was becoming of great strategic value because of the imminent opening of the Suez Canal. The Bourbons were considered unreliable due to their increasing openings towards the Russian Empire. The Royal Navy defended the landing party from the Bourbons and donors from the United Kingdom supported the expedition financially with large part of the money being used to bribe disloyal Bourbon military officers.

Background
The Expedition took place within the overall process of the unification of Italy, which was largely orchestrated by Camillo Cavour, Prime Minister of Sardinia-Piedmont, as his life's work.  After the annexation of the Grand Duchy of Tuscany, the Duchies of Modena and Parma and the Romagna to Piedmont in March 1860, Italian nationalists set their sights on the Kingdom of the Two Sicilies, which comprised all of southern mainland Italy and Sicily, as the next step toward their dream of unification of all Italian lands.

In 1860 Garibaldi, already the most famous Italian revolutionary leader, was in Genoa planning an expedition against Sicily and Naples, with the covert support of the United Kingdom. Lorenzo del Boca suggested that British support for Garibaldi's expedition was spurred by the necessity to obtain more favourable economic conditions for Sicilian sulfur, which was needed in great quantities for munitions.

Search for a casus belli
The Kingdom of Sardinia-Piedmont needed a presentable casus belli in order to attack the Kingdom of the Two Sicilies. This was needed for the House of Savoy, which however never gave any declaration of war against the Bourbon kingdom, a necessary condition, since this was among the requirements presented to Cavour. The only occurrence that would have satisfied this requirement was an uprising from within. Such an event would have felt the alienation of the people to the dynasty that ruled in Naples and, particularly, the inability of Francis of Bourbon, to ensure, in forms acceptable public policy in their domains. Sicily, as shown by the history of the past decades, was fertile ground, and the liberal south, especially those returning after an amnesty granted by the young King, who worked in this direction for some time.

The expedition

The Red Shirts
In March 1860, exile Rosolino Pilo exhorted Giuseppe Garibaldi to take charge of an expedition to liberate southern Italy from Bourbon rule. Garibaldi was against it at first, but eventually agreed. By May 1860, Garibaldi had collected 1,089 volunteers for his expedition to Sicily.

A total of 336 volunteers came from the contemporary Italian regions, including Genoa (156 volunteers), Tuscany (78 volunteers), Sicily (45 volunteers) and Naples (46 volunteers), with only 11 from Rome and the Papal States.  The largest number of volunteers came from Austrian Lombardy and Venetia, with 434 from Lombardy and 194 from Venetia. An additional 33 foreign volunteers joined the expedition. This included 14 ethnic Italians from the Trentino region of Austria, as well as István Türr and three other Hungarians. The volunteers came from middle-class backgrounds, with the vast majority being students and skilled craftsmen.

The 1,089 volunteers were unfavourably armed with obsolete muskets, and wore red shirts and grey trousers as their uniform.

During the night of 5 May, a small group led by Nino Bixio "seized" two steamships in Genoa from the Rubattino shipping company. (The ships were actually secretly provided by Rubattino.) The two ships were renamed Il Piemonte and Il Lombardo. At nearby Quarto dei Mille, the volunteers (including Francesco Crispi's wife, Rosalia Montmasson) embarked for Sicily.

According to Schneid, "Before embarking on the adventure, Garibaldi once again pledged his loyalty to Victor Emmanuel II and proclaimed that his intention was to conquer Sicily for the king. There is every indication that there was far more collusion between Cavour and Garibaldi, if not Victor Emmanuel and Garibaldi. After Garibaldi landed in Sicily, Admiral Persano received orders to support the expedition."

Landing in Sicily

The ships were then accompanied by the British Royal Navy which consisted of HMS Hannibal followed by the gunboats Argus and Intrepid under the command of Admiral Rodney Mundy. They landed at Marsala, on the westernmost point of Sicily, on 11 May. With British ships present in the harbour, the Bourbon ships were deterred from interfering. The Lombardo was attacked and sunk only after the disembarkation had been completed, while the Piemonte was captured. The landing had been preceded by the arrival of Francesco Crispi and others, who had the task of gaining the support of the locals for the volunteers.

Calatafimi and Palermo

The Mille won a first battle at Calatafimi against around 2,000 Neapolitan troops on 15 May. The battle boosted the morale of the Mille and, at the same time, depressed the Neapolitans, who were poorly led by their often corrupted higher officers, and started to feel themselves abandoned.  Having promised land to every male who volunteered to fight against the Bourbons the ranks of the Mille enlarged to 1,200 with local men.

On 27 May, with the help of a popular insurrection organized by La Masa and Gilbrossa, Garibaldi took Porto Termini and began the Siege of Palermo.  General Lanza had replaced Castelcicala, and had under his command 21,000 troops, and a squadron of warships. Yet, the British Admiral Mundy organized an armistice, and the garrison evacuated on 7 July, after King Francis II authorized the Neapolitan withdrawal.

On 7 July, Garibaldi proclaimed himself Dictator of Sicily "in the name of Victor Emmanuel, King of Italy." He reorganized the Thousand into the Southern Army, with the arrival of Giacomo Medici's additional troops, weapons, and ammunition. Garibaldi then ordered Medici to advance towards Messina, Enrico Cosenz to advance upon Catania, and Nino Bixio to advance upon Siracusa, gathering more Sicilian volunteer irregulars. Francis II strengthened his Neapolitan garrisons at Messina and Siracusa.

Neapolitan retreat and Battle of Milazzo

The Bourbon troops were ordered to retreat eastwards and evacuate the island. An insurrection that had broken out in Catania on 31 May, led by Nicola Fabrizi, was crushed by the local garrison, but the order to leave for Messina meant that this Neapolitan tactical success would have no practical results.

At the time only Syracuse, Augusta, Milazzo and Messina remained in royal hands in Sicily. In the meantime Garibaldi issued his first law. A levy failed to muster more than 20,000 troops, while the peasants, who hoped for an immediate relief from the grievous conditions to which they were forced by the landowners, revolted in several localities. At Bronte, on 4 August 1860, Garibaldi's friend Nino Bixio bloodily repressed one of these revolts with two battalions of Redshirts.

The pace of Garibaldi's victories had worried Cavour, who in early July sent him a proposal of immediate annexation of Sicily to Piedmont. Garibaldi, however, refused vehemently to allow such a move until the end of the war. Cavour's envoy, La Farina, was arrested and expelled from the island. He was replaced by the more malleable Agostino Depretis, who gained Garibaldi's trust and was appointed as pro-dictator.

On 25 June 1860, King Francis II of the Two Sicilies had issued a constitution. However, this late attempt to conciliate his moderate subjects failed to rouse them to defend the regime, while liberals and revolutionaries were eager to welcome Garibaldi.

On 20 July Garibaldi attacked Milazzo with 4,000 men, under the command of Medici and Cosenz, against Bosco's 4,500. On 1 August, Bosco surrendered with honors, and was taken by ship to Real Cittadella, which was soon under siege. Over the next three weeks, with firm control of Sicily, Garibaldi prepared to cross the Straits of Messina.

Landing and conquest in Calabria
On 19 August Garibaldi's men disembarked in Calabria, a move opposed by Cavour, who had written the Dictator a letter urging him to not cross the strait. Garibaldi, however, disobeyed, an act which had the silent approval of King Victor Emmanuel.

According to Schneid, "The timing of Garibaldi's crossing of the Straits of Messina and the invasion of the Papal States was more than coincidence.

The Bourbons had some 20,000 men in Calabria, but, apart from some episodes like that of Reggio Calabria, which was conquered at high cost by Bixio on 21 August, they offered insignificant resistance, as numerous units of the Bourbon army disbanded spontaneously or even joined Garibaldi's ranks. On 30 August a conspicuous Sicilian army, led by general Ghio, was officially disbanded at Soveria Mannelli, while only minor and dispersed units continued the fight. The Neapolitan fleet behaved in a similar way.

The end

On 6 September, King Francis II fled Naples for the fortress city of Gaeta, and moved his army to the Volturno river. Garibaldi took possession of Naples, and on 11 September, crossed the Papal frontier.

On 11 September, Cavour insitgated the invasion of the Papal States, led by Manfredo Fanti. The Papal Army was led by Lamorciére, though Pius IX's hope that Napoleon III and Franz Josef would come to his aid was unfounded. Cialdini's IV Corps attacked Pesaro, Enrico Morozzo Della Rocca's V Corps advanced on Perugia, while Persano blockaded Ancona. On 18 September, the Papal Army under Lamoriciére were defeated during the Battle of Castelfidardo, and the siege of Ancona began, finally to surrender on 29 September. According to Schneid, "The fall of Ancona ended the campaign in the Papal States. The Piedmontese Army occupied most of Umbria and Marche."

According to Schneid, "Garibaldi narrowly won the Battle of Volturno. The Southern Army placed Capua under siege, and the Piedmontese forces marched on Gaeta where the erstwhile Neapolitan king had taken refuge." The Savoia Brigade landed north of Capua, while Della Rocca's V Corps, and the rest of the Piedmontese Army, crossed the Neapolitan frontier.

A few days later (21 October) a plebiscite confirmed the annexation of the Kingdom of the Two Sicilies to the Kingdom of Sardinia by an overwhelming majority.

The end of the expedition is traditionally set with the famous meeting in Teano (northern Campania) between Victor Emmanuel and Garibaldi (26 October 1860). Others assign instead the end of the campaign to the King's entrance into Naples on 7 November.

However, the military campaign was not yet fully completed, as Francis II held out in Gaeta until February of the next year, when he finally surrendered to the Sardinian army led by Enrico Cialdini, and left for exile in the Papal States. Shortly thereafter, in March 1861, the new Kingdom of Italy (Regno d'Italia) was formally established.

Garibaldi asked the King to remain in the former Two Sicilies for a year as dictator. He also asked that his officers be integrated in the new Italian Army. When Victor Emmanuel refused to grant the dictator his request but agreed to integrate the men and officers, he returned to Caprera.

Legacy

The Expedition of the Thousand has traditionally been one of the most celebrated events of the Italian Risorgimento, the process of the unification of Italy.

In the following years, the rise of local resistance (the so-called brigantaggio or brigandage), required at one point the presence of some 140,000 Piedmontese troops to maintain control of the former Kingdom of the Two Sicilies. Traditionally, the handling of the brigantaggio has received a negative judgement by Italian historians, in strict contrast with the heroism attributed to Garibaldi and his followers; the English historian Denis Mack Smith, for example, points out the deficiencies and reticence of the sources available for the period 1861–1946, but the same historian also pointed out the backwardness of the Kingdom of the Two Sicilies at the time of the unification.

The expedition, moreover, obtained the support of the powerful great landowners of southern Italy in exchange for the promise that their properties be left intact in the upcoming political settlement. Numerous Sicilian peasants, however, had joined the Mille hoping instead for a redistribution of the land to the people working it. The consequences of this misunderstanding became evident at Bronte.

See also
 Brigandage in Southern Italy after 1861
 Siege of Gaeta (1860)

Notes

Sources

External links 
 

 
1860 in Italy
Conflicts in 1860
Conflicts in 1861
Military expeditions
1860 in the Kingdom of the Two Sicilies
1861 in the Kingdom of the Two Sicilies
Giuseppe Garibaldi